Isang Kahig, Tatlong Tuka is a 1995 Philippine comedy film directed by Jun Aristorenas. The film stars Vic Sotto, Dang Cecilio and Aiza Seguerra.

Cast
 Vic Sotto as Victor
 Charito Solis
 Dang Cecilio
 Aiza Seguerra
 Ruby Rodriguez
 Rez Cortez
 Berting Labra
 Candy Pangilinan
 Larry Silva
 Yoyong Martirez
 Ritchie D'Horsie
 Danny Labra
 Turko Cervantes
 Joy Viado
 Emille Espino
 Jerome Aristorenas
 Kimberly Flores
 Jean Camille Alejo

References

External links

1995 films
1995 comedy films
Filipino-language films
Philippine comedy films
M-Zet Productions films
Moviestars Production films